GIA Publications, Inc. is a major publisher of hymnals, other sacred music, and music education materials. Headquartered first in Pittsburgh and now Chicago, GIA is affiliated with the Roman Catholic Church. GIA originally stood for Gregorian Institute of America, founded in 1941 by Clifford Bennett with a focus on Gregorian chant. The company has been owned since 1967 by the Harris family, who purchased the company after the previous owner retired in response to the decision of the Second Vatican Council to shift the liturgy from Latin to vernacular.GIA acquired choral music publisher Walton Music in 2013. GIA acquired music education publisher and sacred music competitor World Library Publications in 2020. Also in 2020, GIA acquired music education publisher Meredith Music.

Publications

Hymnals
Worship is a series of traditional hymnals first introduced in 1971, with about 80% of the music intended for organ. The fourth edition published in 2011 addressed changes in the English translation of the Roman Missal.
Worship (1971)
Worship, 2nd ed. (1975)
Worship, 3rd ed. (1986)
Worship, 4th ed. (2011)

Gather is a series of contemporary hymnals, with the two earliest editions intended to be used as a supplement to Worship. The second edition was expanded into a full hymnal in 1994 called Gather Comprehensive with the addition of the most popular traditional hymns and service music from Worship. Following a second edition of Gather Comprehensive in 2006, the series was collapsed into a single third edition in 2011 titled simply Gather but continuing with the mix of contemporary and traditional music from the Comprehensive volumes. A fourth edition was published in 2021.
Gather (1988)
Gather, 2nd ed. (1992)
Gather Comprehensive (1994)
Gather Comprehensive, 2nd ed. (2006)
Gather, 3rd Ed. (2011)
Gather, 4th Ed. (2021)

Others:
RitualSong (1996, 2nd Ed. 2018) - a compromise between the traditional focus of Worship and the contemporary lean of Gather.
Lead Me, Guide Me (1987, 2nd Ed. 2011) - intended for African American congregations
Oramos Cantando/We Pray in Song (2011) - bilingual Spanish-English
One in Faith (2014) - acquired with World Library Publications (WLP) in 2020
Voices - contemporary hymnal acquired from WLP and previously published in three volumes
One Lord, One Faith, One Baptism - African American ecumenical hymnal
African American Heritage Hymnal - African American ecumenical hymnal
Total Praise - Acquired with Meredith Music in 2020; co-published with the Sunday School Publishing Board of the National Baptist Convention
Santo, Santo, Santo/Holy, Holy, Holy - Bilingual Spanish-English
Sound the Bamboo - Asian hymnal
Our Growing Years - retirement community hymnal
Singing Our Faith - for children in kindergarten through eighth grade
Cross Generation (2009) - for young adults

Missals
Seasonal Missalette - published quarterly with traditional music
We Celebrate Missal - three times a year with a balance of traditional and contemporary music
¡Celebremos!/Let Us Celebrate! - quarterly bilingual missal
Word & Song - Annual missalette and hymnal with a balance of traditional and contemporary music

References

External links
About GIA
Ed Harris Interview - NAMM Oral History Library (2010)

Music publishing companies of the United States
Book publishing companies based in Illinois
Religious mass media in the United States
Catholic publishing companies
Contemporary Catholic liturgical music
Companies based in Chicago
Publishing companies established in 1941
1941 establishments in Pennsylvania